The following highways are numbered 811:

Canada
 Ontario Highway 811

Costa Rica
 National Route 811

United States